Leiostyla is a genus of small air-breathing land snails, terrestrial pulmonate gastropod mollusks in the family Lauriidae. 

The genus Leiostyla was previously placed in the subfamily Lauriinae, within the family Pupillidae.

Species 
Species in the genus Leiostyla include:

 Leiostyla abbreviata (R. T. Lowe, 1852) - also known as Madeiran land snail
 Leiostyla albina (Pilsbry, 1931)
 Leiostyla anglica (A. Férussac, 1821)
 Leiostyla arborea (R. T. Lowe, 1855)
 † Leiostyla austriaca (Wenz, 1921) 
 Leiostyla beatae Walther & Hausdorf, 2015
 Leiostyla callathiscus (R. T. Lowe, 1831)
 † Leiostyla capellinii (Sacco, 1886) 
 Leiostyla cassida (R. T. Lowe, 1831)- also known as Madeiran land snail
 Leiostyla cassidula (R. T. Lowe, 1852)
 Leiostyla castanea (Shuttleworth, 1852)
 † Leiostyla castanheiraensis Groh & Pokryszko, 2019 
 Leiostyla caucasica (L. Pfeiffer, 1855)
 Leiostyla cheiligona (R. T. Lowe, 1831)
 Leiostyla colvillei Seddon & Killeen, 1996
 Leiostyla concinna (R. T. Lowe, 1852)
 † Leiostyla cooki Cameron & Pokryszko, 2019 
 Leiostyla corneocostata (Wollaston, 1878) - also known as Madeiran land snail
 Leiostyla crassilabris Hausdorf, 1990
 Leiostyla degenerata (Wollaston, 1878)
 † Leiostyla desertaensis Groh, Cameron & Teixeira, 2019 
 Leiostyla eikenboomi Bank, Menkhorst & Neubert, 2016
 † Leiostyla espigaoensis Seddon, 1990 
 Leiostyla falknerorum Bank, Groh & Ripken, 2002
 Leiostyla ferraria (R. T. Lowe, 1852)
 Leiostyla filicum D. T. Holyoak & Seddon, 1986
 Leiostyla fusca (R. T. Lowe, 1852)
 Leiostyla fuscidula (Morelet, 1860)
 Leiostyla gibba (R. T. Lowe, 1852) - Madeiran land snail
 Leiostyla glomerosa (Suvorov & Schileyko, 1991)
 † Leiostyla gottschicki (Wenz, 1922) 
 Leiostyla heterodon (Pilsbry, 1923)
 Leiostyla honesta (Suvorov & Schileyko, 1991)
 Leiostyla iranica E. Gittenberger & Pieper, 1988
 Leiostyla irrigua (R. T. Lowe, 1852)
 † Leiostyla krstichae Prysjazhnjuk, 2015 
 Leiostyla lamellosa (R. T. Lowe, 1852)
 Leiostyla laurinea (R. T. Lowe, 1852)
 Leiostyla loweana (Wollaston, 1878)
 Leiostyla macilenta (R. T. Lowe, 1852)
 Leiostyla mica (Schileyko, 1998)
 Leiostyla millegrana (R. T. Lowe, 1852)
 Leiostyla monticola (R. T. Lowe, 1831)
 Leiostyla nemethi Hausdorf, 1996
 Leiostyla numidica (Bourguignat, 1864)
 Leiostyla paphlagonica Hausdorf, 1990
 Leiostyla paulinae (Lindholm, 1913)
 † Leiostyla piserai Harzhauser & Neubauer, 2018 
 Leiostyla pontica (Retowski, 1889)
 † Leiostyla priscilla (Paladilhe, 1873) 
 Leiostyla pulchra (Retowski, 1883)
 Leiostyla recta (R. T. Lowe, 1852)
 Leiostyla rectidentata (Schileyko, 1976)
 Leiostyla relevata  (Wollaston, 1878)
 Leiostyla rugulosa (Morelet, 1860)
 Leiostyla schweigeri (Götting, 1963)
 Leiostyla silicea (Schileyko, 1975)
 † Leiostyla simulans Cameron & Groh, 2019 
 Leiostyla simulator (Pilsbry, 1923)
 Leiostyla sinangula (Schileyko, 1975)
 Leiostyla sphinctostoma (R. T. Lowe, 1831)
 † Leiostyla subcorneocostata Seddon, 1990 
 Leiostyla superba Hausdorf, 1990
 Leiostyla superstructa (Mousson, 1876)
 Leiostyla taeniata (Shuttleworth, 1852)
 Leiostyla tenuimarginata (Pilsbry, 1922)
 Leiostyla tesselata (Morelet, 1860)
 Leiostyla vermiculosa (Morelet, 1860)
 Leiostyla vincta (R. T. Lowe, 1852)
 Leiostyla vitrea (Schileyko, 1988)
 † Leiostyla wollastoni (Paiva, 1866) 
 Leiostyla zonifera (Pilsbry, 1934)

Species brought into synonymy
 Leiostyla adolfi Pokryszko, 1991: synonym of Leiostyla paulinae (Lindholm, 1913) (junior synonym)

References 

 Lindholm, W. A. (1924). A revised systematic list of the genera of the Clausiliidae, recent and fossil, with their subdivisions, synonymy, and types. Proceedings of the Malacological Society of London. 16 (1)
 Bank, R. A. (2017). Classification of the Recent terrestrial Gastropoda of the World. Last update: July 16th, 2017

External links
 

 
Lauriidae
Taxa named by Richard Thomas Lowe
Gastropod genera